The 1964 Sutton Council election took place on 7 May 1964 to elect members of Sutton London Borough Council in London, England. The whole council was up for election and the Conservative party gained control of the council.

Background
These elections were the first to the newly formed borough. Previously elections had taken place in the Municipal Borough of Beddington and Wallington, Municipal Borough of Sutton and Cheam and Carshalton Urban District. These boroughs and districts were joined to form the new London Borough of Barnet by the London Government Act 1963.

A total of 157 candidates stood in the election for the 51 seats being contested across 25 wards. These included a full slate from the Conservative and Labour parties, while the Liberals stood 42 candidates. Other candidates included 10 Residents and 3 Communists. There were 24 two-seat wards and 1 three-seat wards.

This election had aldermen as well as directly elected councillors.  The Conservatives got 5 aldermen and Labour 3.

The Council was elected in 1964 as a "shadow authority" but did not start operations until 1 April 1965.

Election result
The results saw the Conservatives gain the new council with a majority of 9 after winning 30 of the 51 seats. Overall turnout in the election was 45.0%. This turnout included 653 postal votes.

Ward results

References

1964
1964 London Borough council elections